Ardath is an 1889 novel by the British writer Marie Corelli. It was a popular success.

References

Bibliography
 Brenda Ayres & Sarah E. Maier. Reinventing Marie Corelli for the Twenty-First Century. Anthem Press, 2019.

1889 British novels
Novels by Marie Corelli
Novels about writers